Hayley Squires (born 16 April 1988) is an English actress and playwright, best known for her work in the Ken Loach film I, Daniel Blake. Squires has also appeared in Call the Midwife (2012), Southcliffe (2013), Complicit (2013), Blood Cells (2014), A Royal Night Out (2015) and Murder (2016). Her first play, Vera Vera Vera, was produced by the Royal Court Theatre in 2012.

I, Daniel Blake won the Palme d'Or at the Cannes Film Festival, Best British Film at the 2017 BAFTAs, and was the Audience Award winner at the San Sebastián International Film Festival. Squires was nominated for Best Supporting Actress at the BAFTAs.

Early life 
Born in Forest Hill, South London, as Hayley McGinty in 1988, Squires grew up with her mother, father and older brother.  The family moved to Kent when she was 14. Her mother was a cook at her school and her father managed a video shop.  

She trained at Rose Bruford College in Sidcup and graduated in 2010 with BA (Hons) Acting alongside best friend and fellow actor David Carlyle. She has a quote from A Midsummer Night's Dream tattooed underneath her left arm, it reads: And though she be but little, she is fierce.

Filmography

Film

Television

Theatre credits

Awards

References

External links 
 

1988 births
Living people
English film actresses
English television actresses
21st-century British dramatists and playwrights
British women dramatists and playwrights
21st-century English women writers
21st-century English actresses
People from Forest Hill, London
Writers from London
Actresses from London
Alumni of Rose Bruford College
International Emmy Award for Best Actress winners